Charles Spooner (23 July 1909 – 21 November 1988) was a Barbadian cricketer. He played in five first-class matches for Barbados and Trinidad and Tobago from 1933 to 1938.

See also
 List of Barbadian representative cricketers

References

External links
 

1909 births
1988 deaths
Barbadian cricketers
Barbados cricketers
Trinidad and Tobago cricketers
People from Saint Michael, Barbados